Albert Per Andersson (25 April 1902, Tryde, Scania – 5 March 1977) was a Swedish gymnastics who competed in the 1920 Summer Olympics.

He was part of the Swedish team, which was able to win the gold medal in the gymnastics men's team, Swedish system event in 1920. He also competed in the men's 110 metres hurdles at the 1928 Summer Olympics.

References

External links
Database Olympics Profile

1902 births
1977 deaths
People from Tomelilla Municipality
Swedish male artistic gymnasts
Gymnasts at the 1920 Summer Olympics
Olympic gymnasts of Sweden
Olympic gold medalists for Sweden
Olympic medalists in gymnastics
Medalists at the 1920 Summer Olympics
Athletes (track and field) at the 1928 Summer Olympics
Olympic athletes of Sweden
Sportspeople from Skåne County
20th-century Swedish people